The Brünnelistock (2,133 m) is a mountain of the Schwyzer Alps, located on the border between the cantons of Schwyz and Glarus. It lies north of the Mutteristock, on the range between the Wägitalersee and the Obersee.

References

External links
Brünnelistock on Hikr

Mountains of the Alps
Mountains of Switzerland
Mountains of the canton of Schwyz
Mountains of the canton of Glarus
Glarus–Schwyz border
Two-thousanders of Switzerland